Atilio François (22 May 1922 – 27 September 1997) was a Uruguayan cyclist. He competed at the 1948 and 1952 Summer Olympics.

References

1922 births
1997 deaths
Uruguayan male cyclists
Olympic cyclists of Uruguay
Cyclists at the 1948 Summer Olympics
Cyclists at the 1952 Summer Olympics